Alibek Sapayev (born 16 June 1987) is a Turkmenian professional football referee. He has been a full international for FIFA since 2011. and has refereed in some AFC Champions League matches.

References

External links 
 
 

1986 births
Living people
Turkmenistan football referees